Mor Ivanios Mathews (born 29 April 1954) is a Syriac Orthodox bishop, currently the Metropolitan of Kandanad Diocese.

Education
Mor Ivanios Mathews has obtained Master of Arts degree and has a Bachelor of Theology degree from Papal Seminary, Pune.

Ordination
In 1972 Baselios Paulose II Catholicos ordained him as Deacon and in 1976 as Kassisso. Later in 2001 Patriarch Ignatius Zakka I consecrated him as metropolitan at Damascus, Syria.

References 

Living people
Syriac Orthodox Church bishops
Indian Oriental Orthodox Christians
People from Ernakulam district
1954 births